PNS Zulfiquar (FFG-251) is the lead ship of the F-22P Zulfiquar-class guided missile frigates since 2009. She was designed and constructed by Chinese firm, Hudong-Zhonghua Shipbuilding in Shanghai, for the Pakistan Navy. The vessel's design is primarily influenced from the Type 053H3 frigate.

Design and construction

After the bilateral contract was signed between Pakistan and China on 4 April 2006, she was designed and constructed by the Hudong–Zhonghua Shipbuilding Co. in China and her steel cutting was held on 10 October 2006 in Shanghai.

She was officially laid down on 24 July 2007 and was launched on 7 April 2008 to complete several sea trials in China. She is the lead ship of her class and was acquired by the Pakistan Navy on 30 July 2009.  On 12 September 2009, she arrived and reported to her base, Naval Base Karachi and commissioned in the Navy.

The induction ceremony was held on 19 September 2009 with former Chairman joint chiefs General Tariq Majid visiting the ship and presented her with military colors. The warship was later visited by General Ashfaq Pervez, the army chief and Admiral Noman Bashir who went to visit senior American officer, possibly Adm. Mike Mullen, abroad on the American aircraft carrier.

Deployments and war service

Following her commissioning, Zulfiquar has been deployed to witnessed actions in the War on Terror in Afghanistan and the piracy off the coast of Somalia, when she was deployed to lead military operation to provide rescue and sealift of the personnel of MV Suez in 2011.

On 6 September 2014, a serious incident took place involving Zulfiquar when al-Qaeda's Indian subcontinent branch attempted to take control of the vessel after penetrating the Naval Base Karachi. The Navy Special Service Group's Navy SEAL Teams and 1st Marines responded by engaging the attackers and succeeded in capturing four assailants alive who were locked away in the ship's compartment. The motive appeared to be that the attackers, still on active duty with the Navy, wanted to engage the U.S. Navy's fleet in the Indian Ocean with its cruise and anti-ship missile system.

Several Western sources reported that 11 people were killed following a gunfight and a suicide attack: 10 attackers—four on the Zulfiquar, including the organizers of the attack (Lieutenant Zeeshan Rafiq and Owais Jakhrani, a former lieutenant), and six more dressed as marines who attempted to infiltrate the ship via a nearby dinghy—and one petty officer.

On 13 September 2014, the Navy confirmed that it had detained 17 naval personnel including three key naval officers who were trying to flee to Afghanistan through Mastung in Balochistan in Pakistan. On 25 March 2016, the Navy JAG Corps announced that five naval officers had been sentenced to death for their involvement in the attack.

Unnamed officials told Steve Coll that India's Research and Analysis Wing (R&AW) has evidence indicating that, unbeknownst to the attackers, the Zulfiquar was carrying a nuclear warhead during the incident. However, this intelligence reporting is uncorroborated and notably inconsistent with public information regarding Pakistan's nuclear weapons program, its delivery systems, and its methods of handling nuclear materials.

Gallery

References

External links
 

F-22P Zulfiquar-class frigate
2008 ships
Ships built in China
Military operations of the insurgency in Khyber Pakhtunkhwa